Bundar may refer to:
Bundar, Iran, a village in Hormozgan Province
Pier